Mexico–New Zealand relations are the diplomatic relations between Mexico and New Zealand. Both nations are members of the Asia-Pacific Economic Cooperation, Organisation for Economic Co-operation and Development and the United Nations.

History 
The earliest contact between Mexico and New Zealand may have occurred in the 16th or 17th century when Spanish ships carrying both Spanish and Mexican crew members between Acapulco, Mexico and Manila, Philippines sailed close to and may have shipwrecked in New Zealand. Initially, relations between both nations were conducted via-London as New Zealand was part of the British Empire. During World War II both nations fought together in the Pacific War.

Diplomatic relations were officially established between both nations on 19 July 1973. In 1980, New Zealand Prime Minister Robert Muldoon became the first New Zealand head-of-government to visit Mexico. In 1983, New Zealand opened an embassy in Mexico City. For its part, Mexico at first conducted diplomatic relations with New Zealand from its embassy in Canberra, Australia and operated honorary consulates in Auckland and Wellington. On 30 December 1991, Mexico opened an embassy in Wellington. In 1999, President Ernesto Zedillo became the first Mexican head-of-state to visit New Zealand. In 2013, both nations commemorated 40 years since the establishment of diplomatic relations. In November 2014, Mexican Foreign Secretary José Antonio Meade paid a visit to New Zealand and held meeting with New Zealand Foreign Minister Murray McCully.

High-level visits

High-level visits from Mexico to New Zealand

 President Ernesto Zedillo (1999)
 President Felipe Calderón (2007)
 Foreign Secretary José Antonio Meade (2014)
 Foreign Undersecretary Carlos de Icaza (2016)

High-level visits from New Zealand to Mexico

 Prime Minister Robert Muldoon (1980)
 Prime Minister Jim Bolger (1992)
 Prime Minister Jenny Shipley (1999)
 Prime Minister Helen Clark (2001, 2002)
 Prime Minister John Key (2013)
 Foreign Subsecretary for the Americas and Asia Andrea Smith (2014)

Agreements
Both nations have signed numerous bilateral agreements such as an Agreement on Mexican and New Zealand Banks to Share Information (1992); Trade and investment agreement (1994); Air service Agreement (1999);  Agreement on Scientific, Research and Technological Cooperation (2004); Agreement on the Avoidance of Double-Taxation and Tax Evasion (2006); Agreement on a Working holiday visa (2007); Agreement on Agricultural and Forestry Cooperation (2008) and an Agreement of Cooperation in the field of Renewable Energy (2010).

Trade
Mexico is New Zealand's biggest trading partner in Latin-America (and 24th overall) and is an important market for New Zealand milk based products. In 2018, two-way trade between both nations amounted to US$423 million. Mexico's exports to New Zealand are mainly manufactured and industrial products. New Zealand's exports to Mexico include: dairy products, meat and agricultural machinery. New Zealand is Mexico's 49th biggest trading partner. Since 2012, Mexico, New Zealand and eight other countries have been negotiating what is to be known as the Trans-Pacific Partnership (TPP) trade agreement. In 2012, New Zealand was granted observer status for the Pacific Alliance, a regional group that includes Chile, Colombia, Mexico and Peru.

Resident diplomatic missions
 Mexico has an embassy in Wellington.  
 New Zealand has an embassy in Mexico City.

See also
 List of ambassadors of New Zealand to Mexico

References 

 
New Zealand
Bilateral relations of New Zealand